The North and East Operations Medal (Sinhala: උතුරු නැගෙනහිර සංග්‍රාමික පදක්කම uthuru nægenahira sangrāmika padakkama) was a decoration presented to servicepersons of the Military of Sri Lanka and Sri Lanka Police for service in the country's Northern and Eastern provinces during the course of the Sri Lankan Civil War between 23 July 1982 and 1 January 2010.

Eligibility
General requirements for eligibility, particularly applicable to members of the Sri Lanka Air Force and Sri Lanka Police, were 3 years of cumulative service in the two provinces between the 23 July 1982 and 1 January 2010. Army personnel are subject to a more specific set of rules, requiring 3 years of cumulative service in:
Districts of Jaffna, Vavuniya, Kilinochchi, Mullaitivu, Mannar, Batticaloa, Trincomalee and Ampara,
Divisional secretarial divisions of Nochchiyagama, Nuwaragampalatha (Central) and Wilachchiya of Anuradhapura District,
Divisional secretarial divisions of Kalpitiya, Wanathawilluwa and Karuwalagaswewa of Puttalam District,
Divisional secretarial divisions of Dimbulagala ana Kankapura of Polonnaruwa District
to be considered eligible. Similarly, naval personnel are required to have served in:
Eastern Naval Area,
Northern Naval Area,
North Central Naval Area,
SLNS Vijaya (since 1 January 1997)
to be eligible for the award.

As with other Sri Lankan military decorations, individuals required a formal recommendation from their immediate superiors and service commander to be considered for award. Shorter service (180 days) in these operational areas allowed for the grant of the Purna Bhumi Padakkama.

Clasps 
A maximum of two clasps could also be awarded with the first for a cumulative 5-year service period and a second for a cumulative 10-year service period, subject to the rules of the service branch in question. Each clasp is denoted by a silver color disk on the ribbon bar.

References

Sri Lankan Military awards and decorations

External links
Sri Lanka Army
Sri Lanka Navy
Sri Lanka Air Force
Sri Lanka Police
Ministry of Defence : Sri Lanka

Sri Lankan campaign medals
Awards established in 1983